Kakhandaki is a village in Karnataka, India. It is located 32 km from Bijapur. There is a temple of a Swami named 'Mahipati'.

This place is famous for Shri. Mahipati Rayara Vrundaavana and the Aaradhane festival happens on Chchatti Amavasya of every year.
Nearest airport is Belgaum Airport. Mulvad Railway Station is the nearest railhead.

Population

See also
 Haridasa

External links
 Prasanna Venkatadasa (1680 to 1752): Prasanna Venkata 

Villages in Bijapur district, Karnataka